The 2019 Formula D season (officially titled Formula DRIFT Black Magic Pro Championship) was the sixteenth season of the Formula D series. The series began on April 6 at Long Beach and concluded on October 19 at Toyota Speedway at Irwindale after eight events.

James Deane won his third consecutive championship with the Worthouse Drifting team, and his teammate Piotr Więcek placed fourth in points. This season proved to be the final Formula Drift appearance for the team and for both drivers: it was announced in 2020 that Worthouse had withdrawn from the series and that both its drivers were pursuing other opportunities.

Driver Travis Reeder made Formula Drift history by becoming the first driver to compete with an electric vehicle. His team Napoleon Motorsports developed a fully electric Chevrolet Camaro dubbed the Chevrolet Camaro EL1. Reeder was unable to run it during the opening round at Long Beach since the event's fire safety teams had not been given training on electric vehicle fires. He practiced with the car during the second round at Orlando but competed with his regular Nissan 240SX S13. The car made its first competitive appearance in the third round at Road Atlanta, and he campaigned it until the finale at Irwindale when minor issues forced him to revert to his S13.

Two drivers also made history during the season by scoring a perfect 100 on a qualifying run, something that had only been previously achieved by Tanner Foust at Sonoma Raceway in 2006. Justin Pawlak recorded a perfect score during the fourth round at Wall Speedway, and James Deane recorded a perfect score during the seventh round at Texas Motor Speedway.

Two drivers made a one-off appearance at Long Beach: Mitch Larner, renting a Toyota 2JZ powered Nissan 240SX S14 from fellow competitor Forrest Wang, and Manuel Vacca, driving a BMW E46.

Entries

Schedule

Championship standings

Scoring system
Points were awarded for qualifying and for the main event. During qualifying, drivers performed solo runs which were judged on parameters such as line, angle, fluidity and commitment and assigned a numerical score up to 100. These scores were then ranked to determine the qualifying classification and hence populate the brackets for the competition phase. Up to 6 points were then awarded for the top 32 qualifiers.

The qualifiers proceed through a series of competition heats, with those eliminated in the first round (Top 32) receiving 16 points, the second round (Sweet 16) receiving 32 points, the third round (Great 8) receiving 48 points, and the fourth round (Final Four) receiving 64 points and classifying 3rd and 4th. Of the two drivers eliminated in the Final Four, the driver who qualified highest is awarded third place and the final step on the podium. In the Final, the runner-up receives 80 points and the winner 100 points. Final classification within each round is then determined by highest qualifying position; for example, of the two drivers eliminated in the Final Four, the driver who qualified higher is awarded 3rd position and the final place on the podium.

Qualifying stage

Competition stage

Pro Championship standings

Auto Cup standings
Auto Cup points are awarded each round to the two drivers with the highest classified finish for each manufacturer. To be eligible, both the chassis and engine must have been constructed by that manufacturer.

Tire Cup standings
Tire Cup points are awarded each round to the two drivers with the highest classified finish for each tire manufacturer.

Footnotes

References 

Formula D seasons
Formula D